Gostyukhino is a rural locality (a settlement) in Klyazminskoye Rural Settlement, Kovrovsky District, Vladimir Oblast, Russia. The population was 31 as of 2010.

Geography 
The village is located 9 km south-west from Klyazmensky Gorodok, 10 km east from Kovrov.

References 

Rural localities in Kovrovsky District